Solana, officially the Municipality of Solana, is a 1st class municipality in the province of Cagayan, Philippines. According to the 2020 census, it has a population of 88,445 people.

The Municipality of Solana was founded on August 18, 1952, and named after then 
Governor Antonio Urbiztondo Marquez dela Solana. It is a first class municipality 
covering an area of 277.22 square kilometers with 38 barangays. The Municipality is surrounded by the following: on the east by the magical 
Cagayan River, bounded on the north by the Municipality of Amulung, on the south by 
the Municipality of Enrile, on the southwest by the Province of Kalinga and on the 
northwest by the Municipalities of Piat and Tuao.

The Awidon Mesa Formationa Paleolithic Sites of the municipality, along with the Callao Limestone Formation Paleolithic Sites neighboring Penablanca, are included in the tentative list of the Philippines for future UNESCO World Heritage Site inscription under the name of Paleolithic Archaeological Sites in Cagayan Valley. The Awidon Mesa Formation has at least 68 Paleolithic sites which yielded stone tools and fossils of extinct animals that include stegodons, elephants, rhinoceros, and large tortoise.

Geography

Topography
Solana is mostly flat with mountainous terrain on the central area from Barangay Madarallug going north to Barangay Iraga due to the Barung Anticline and Liwan Syncline.

The municipality is bounded by the Cagayan River to the East, Amulung to the North, Enrile to the South and Municipality of Tuao and Piat to the West.

With its proximity in the Cagayan River, it is usually flooded during typhoon season where the river is usually swollen thus providing a fluvial soil good for farming.

Barangays
Solana is politically subdivided into 38 barangays. These barangays are headed by elected officials: Barangay Captain, Barangay Council, whose members are called Barangay Councilors. All are elected every three years.

Climate

Just like the general climatic conditions of the Philippines, the municipality of Solana's climate is tropical and maritime. It is characterized by relatively high temperature, high humidity and abundant rainfall.

 
Based from the Climate Map of PAGASA, the municipality belongs to the Type III Climate with no very pronounced maximum rain period with a dry season lasting only from one to three monthse either from December to February or from March to May.

Demographics

Economy

Government
Solana, belonging to the third legislative district of the province of Cagayan, is governed by a mayor designated as its local chief executive and by a municipal council as its legislative body in accordance with the Local Government Code. The Sangguniang Bayan is composed of the (Municipality) Vice Mayor as Presiding Officer, regular Sanggunian members (Councilors), the President of the Association of Barangay Captains and the President of the Sangguniang Kabataan. They shall exercise and perform the legislative powers and duties as provided for under Republic Act No. 7160, otherwise known as the Local Government Code of 1991. Shall consider and conduct thorough study all matters brought to their attention and consequently pass resolutions, enact ordinances and to introduce recommendations.

Elected officials

Elected officials

Education
The Schools Division of Cagayan governs the town's public education system.

It is also in Solana where the SDO office transfer its location after it the division office building located near the Boy Scout of the Philippines – Cagayan Chapter Office and the Cagayan National High School was razed by fire on August 10, 2012. Immediately on the following day, the Office of the Division of Cagayan was temporarily transferred to the defunct DPWH Building at Lingu, Solana, Cagayan until November 15, 2017.

The division office is a field office of the DepEd in Cagayan Valley region. The office governs the public and private elementary and public and private high schools throughout the municipality.

Solana is currently divided into 3 district namely Solana North, Solana South and Solana West Educational Zone. According to SDO Cagayan, it has 10 public elementary schools in Solana North, 10 public elementary in Solana South and 14 in Solana West Educational Zone

The High school students from the Municipality is also catered by 6 public secondary schools namely Solana Freshwater Fisheries School, Dassun NHS, Andarayan NHS, Solana NHS, Gadu NHS and Sampaguita NHS.

The only Catholic School that serves the area is Saint Vincent Ferrer Institute (SVI) under Saint Vincent Ferrer Parish which offers basic education from elementary to senior high school.

Cagayan State University has also established another campus in the area. By the virtue of Republic Act 11858, the extension campus was converted into a regular campus to be known at Cagayan State University - Solana Campus. The said higher education institution will offer academic programs in Teacher Education, Agriculture, Fisheries, Information and Computing Sciences, and Criminology.

References

External links
 [ Philippine Standard Geographic Code]
Philippine Census Information

Municipalities of Cagayan
Populated places on the Rio Grande de Cagayan